The Hongorai River is a river on the southern coast of Bougainville Island.

It is located within the Autonomous Region of Bougainville, in northeastern Papua New Guinea.

Rivers of Papua New Guinea
Geography of the Autonomous Region of Bougainville